Alonso Hernández Puertocarrero (before 1495–1523) was a Spanish conquistador who was part of Hernán Cortés's expedition of conquest of what is today Mexico.

Soon after arriving on the eastern shore of Mexico with a gift of a grey mare from Cortés, Hernández was elected alcayde along with Francisco de Montejo of Villa Rica de la Vera Cruz.

After the Battle of Centla at Potonchán, Cortés awarded Hernandez with Malinche for use as a slave who was one of 20 slave girls given to the Spaniards as part of a peace treaty with the defeated city. However, Cortés later took Malinche back for himself after discovering she could speak Nahuatl along with Chontal Mayan thus making her indispensable as a translator and as a cultural interpreter. Later, Hernandez received the daughter of Totonac Chief Cuesco as a gift and baptized her Doña Francisca.

Cortés also sent Hernandez, along with de Montejo, back to Spain to provide King Charles with details of the expedition.

References

Spanish conquistadors
Spanish city founders
People of New Spain
1495 births
1523 deaths
History of the Aztecs
Colonial Mexico
Veracruz (city)
People from Las Vegas Altas
16th-century Mexican people
16th-century Spanish people